The Kawasaki Z1000 is a four-cylinder motorcycle introduced in 2003 with  streetfighter or standard styling. The Z1000 was first introduced in 1977 superseding the previous 903 cc capacity Z1/Z900.

History

In 2003 Kawasaki introduced a completely revamped 30-year anniversary edition of the Z1000. It used a modified engine from the Kawasaki ZX-9R, and was bored out by 2.2 mm resulting in bigger displacement, more low-RPM torque, and only a slight power loss of 4 bhp from the original ZX9. In 2004, Kawasaki released the Z1000's smaller brother, the Z750. In 2007, Kawasaki released a new Z1000.

In October 2009, Kawasaki unveiled the 2010 Z1000.  It had a new aluminum frame, digital instrument panel, bodywork, and engine. Bore and stroke are 77 x 56 mm, 1 mm more than the ZX-10R's 76 x 55 mm displacing 1,043 cc. That is up from the previous model's 953 cc. Compression ratio is 11.8:1, and fuel injection is handled by a bank of 38-mm Keihin throttle bodies.

2003–2006 models
Stylistically, the 2003 Z1000 was a departure from other naked sportbikes of the time.  The Z1000 used the same tail section that was being used on the 2003 ZX6R 636 cc sport bike. 

It has a 4-2-4 exhaust system. The Z1000 uses a backbone frame that supports the engine as a stressed member.  Engine mounts can be removed to ease access for maintenance. Compression damping is done on one fork leg, rebound damping on the  other. This technology is from dirt bikes, and is rare on street motorcycles. The Nissin brakes have four piston calipers.

2007–2009 models
In 2007 Kawasaki released an updated version of the Z1000.  The bike features a detuned version of the ZX-9R engine.  This detuning, in addition to the design of the exhaust, provides less top end compared to the super-sport ZX-9R engine, but more low to mid rpm range.

2010–2013 models

The Z1000 was redesigned for 2010. Along with the customary styling update came a slightly larger capacity engine. The motorcycle was officially marketed as the "Z1000 ABS", as ABS came fitted as standard.

In 2013 Kawasaki broke with the 3-year update cycle and choose to release a "special edition" – alongside the standard edition – to mark the 40th anniversary of the Z brand. The differences between the models were purely aesthetic.

2014–2016 models
The Z1000 was restyled and updated for 2014, making slightly more power; and front brake caliper are 4-piston monoblock. Also a  big piston Showa separate function fork along with lighter wheels and a slightly larger gas tank.

Specifications

See also 
 Kawasaki Z series

References

Z1000
Standard motorcycles
Motorcycles introduced in 2003